EllisDon is an employee-owned construction services company that was founded and incorporated in 1951 in London, Ontario, Canada, by brothers Don and David Ellis Smith. The company is headquartered in Mississauga, Ontario, Canada.

History

Founding
In 1951, EllisDon was launched by brothers Don and David Ellis Smith as a local contractor in London, Ontario.

1951–1989
Between 1956 and 1968, EllisDon computerized its accounting and cost control systems, and operated a purchased tower crane – the first construction company in Canada to do both. In 1971, EllisDon launched a Corporate Safety Strategy to improve job site safety.

Between 1974 and 1976, the company expanded, establishing operations in Edmonton, Alberta and in Saudi Arabia. Since then EllisDon has expanded its current operations to its offices around the world.

Once EllisDon was awarded the Construction Management Contract for the Metro Toronto Convention Centre project in 1982, it moved on to build the SkyDome (renamed Rogers Centre in 2005). This project was completed in 1989, and was the world's first retractable rooftop stadium.

1990–2003
In 1990, EllisDon established the construction industry's first freestanding Research and Development Department. Following that, EllisDon in 1993 became the first Canadian company to build in Latvia and Lithuania following the removal of the Iron Curtain in the USSR. In 1997, EllisDon completed its first project in Malaysia.

In 1996, Don Smith's son, Geoff Smith – who joined the company as a full-time employee in 1982 – became EllisDon's president and CEO.

2004–present
In 2004, EllisDon participated in a new hospital funding model, a public-private partnership (PPP) with the $450 million William Osler Health Centre in Brampton, Ontario.

EllisDon delivered Toronto's MaRS (Medical and Related Services) Convergence Centre (Building B) in 2005.

In 2008, EllisDon completed construction and installation work in the Dubai Waterfront, the largest waterfront development of its kind in the world.

In 2010, EllisDon completed Winnipeg International Airport Terminal Building, Canada's first LEED (Leadership in Energy and Environmental Design) certified airport terminal.

In June 2016, EllisDon launched The Carbon Impact Initiative Action Plan in support of Canada's international climate change commitments. Industry executives, in collaboration with government leaders, established the initiative outlining strategies to transform the market toward a low-carbon economy. Mohawk College's Joyce Centre for Partnership and Innovation Building is Ontario's first net-zero institutional building as well as the first pilot project under the Carbon Impact Initiative.

In March 2018, EllisDon acquired the interests of joint venture partner Carillion (in liquidation in the UK) in four Ontario hospital projects, becoming the sole service provider at Royal Ottawa Hospital, Oakville-Trafalgar Memorial Hospital, Brampton Civic Hospital and Sault Area Hospital.

Selected projects 

Alternative energy 
 Alberta Children's Hospital - Calgary, Alberta
 Toronto South Detention for Mimico Correctional Centre - Toronto, Ontario

Civil & transportation 
 Highway 7 East Rapidway (H3)- Vivanext - York Region, Ontario 
 Ottawa Light Rail Transit (LRT) Confederation Line - Ottawa, Ontario 
 Union Station improvements - Toronto Transit Commission (TTC)- Toronto, Ontario

Commercial office/retail
 Brentwood Town Centre redevelopment - Burnaby, B.C
 Yorkdale Shopping Centre - Toronto, Ontario

Culture & recreation
 Goldring Centre for High Performance Sport - Toronto, Ontario 
 Halifax Central Library - Halifax, Nova Scotia
 Rogers Centre (formerly Skydome) - Toronto, Ontario
 The Remai Art Gallery of Saskatchewan - Saskatoon, Saskatchewan

Education 
 Nova Scotia Community College, Centre for the Built Environment - Dartmouth, Nova Scotia
 Western University, Richard Ivey School of Business - London, Ontario

Healthcare & research 
 Alberta Children's Hospital - Calgary, Alberta
 Surrey Memorial Hospital - Surrey, B.C. 
 University of British Columbia, Advanced Rare Isotope Laboratory (ARIEL) - Vancouver, B.C.

Industrial & automotive
 American Motors Brampton Assembly Plant - Brampton, Ontario (1987)
 DENSO Manufacturing - Guelph, Ontario

Judicial & correctional
 Saskatoon Police Service Headquarters Building - Saskatoon, Saskatchewan
 Elgin County Courthouse - St. Thomas, ON

Public & government
 Hamilton City Hall renovations - Hamilton, Ontario
 Parliament Hill, West Block demolition & abatement - Ottawa, Ontario

Residential & hospitality 
 Ritz Carlton Residential Tower - Toronto, Ontario
 Windjammer Landing Beach Resort - St. Lucia
 Helio West Five Residential Tower - London, ON

International
 Miami Federal Courthouse - Miami, Florida
 Palm District Cooling Plant - Dubai, United Arab Emirates

Recognition 

 2018 Renew Canada's Top 100 Infrastructure Projects. Achieved Platinum Status.
 2018 Mediacorp's Top 100 Employers (8th consecutive year).
 2017 Mediacorp Canada's Greenest Employers
 2017 Deloitte 50 Best Managed Companies
 2016 Canada's Safest Employer
 2016 Financial Posts Ten Best Companies To Work For

References

External links

Building on a foundation of entrepreneurship at the Toronto Star

Companies based in Mississauga
Construction and civil engineering companies of Canada
Privately held companies of Canada
Employee-owned companies of Canada
1951 establishments in Ontario
Construction and civil engineering companies established in 1951
Canadian companies established in 1951